Opet is a Turkish petroleum company engaged in the sale of commercial and industrial fuels, mineral oils, retail sales, warehousing and international sales. Opet Petroleum’s roots date back to the fuel distribution company "Ozturk Petrol" founded by Ozturk Family.

Having a 50% partnership with Koç Holding Energy Group as of the end of 2002, Opet has focused on infrastructure investments since its inception. The company's warehousing capacity has reached 1.076.318 cubic meters as of 2010. Opet is the first firm ever to have brought 98 octane unleaded fuel to Turkey and introduced Ultra Euro Diesel fuel to Turkish consumers before it was launched in the European market. As the 2nd largest, fuel-oil distribution company in Turkey, Opet has more than 1500 gas stations throughout the country, including those under its SUNPET brand.

As of 2015, Opet has received the 'best in customer satisfaction' award for 10 consecutive years.

Turkish Opet Aviation Fuels 
THY Opet was founded in 2009 as a 50-50 partnership between Turkish Airlines and Opet. The company operates in the aircraft fuel storage and refueling business. As of 2013, Fortune 500 Turkey ranked Turkish Opet as the 25th largest company in the country.

References

External links

 www.opet.com.tr
 www.thyopet.com

Energy companies established in 1992
Oil and gas companies of Turkey
Companies listed on the Istanbul Stock Exchange
Koç family
Turkish brands
Ataşehir
Turkish companies established in 1992